Tatev Chakhian (born 1992) is a Poland-based Armenian poet, artist, editor and translator.

Her debut collection of poetry, Dowód (nie)osobisty ((Non)-Identity Card), got published in 2016 in Armenian and in 2018 in Polish. Selections of her poetry have been translated into English, German, Polish, Czech, Persian, Macedonian, Dutch, Spanish, Italian, Bengali, Turkish, etc. and have been published in anthologies and literary magazines worldwide.

Tatev Chakhian translates and promotes Polish poetry, Iranian contemporary poetry, as well as poetry and prose from Russian and English.

Chakhian combines poetry with visual arts, such as paper collages, collaborates with artists, filmmakers and musicians.

Early life and education 
Born in Yerevan in 1992, in a family of pedagogues. She graduated from the faculty of Cultural Anthropology at Yerevan State University, then got degrees in International Relations and Border Studies at Adam Mickiewicz University in Poznań, and later in English Philology at the same university.

Awards 
Her awards include the "Granish 2022" award in the category of Poetry of The Year, Dionis Maliszewski literary prize (2017), Gazeta Obywatelska prize (2016), the First Lady of Armenia's literary award (2016), and the Sahak Partev prize (2015). Her first poetry collection was nominated for the 2018 European Poet of Freedom Award, an award dedicated to "honouring and promoting phenomena in poetry that deal with one of the most crucial subjects for contemporary readers – freedom – and, at the same time, are characterized by outstanding artistic values."

References

External links 
 
 Armenia, Villages on the Road (poem)

1992 births
21st-century Armenian poets
21st-century Armenian artists
Armenian women artists
Armenian women poets
Living people
21st-century Armenian women writers